Spruce Run is a tributary of the Raritan River in Hunterdon County, New Jersey. It starts from the southwestern slope of Schooley's Mountain, northeast of Anthony in Lebanon Township, and flows southwest toward Glen Gardner. It then flows south toward Clinton, where it joins the South Branch Raritan River. The Mulhockaway Creek is a tributary and flows from Jug Mountain. The southern slopes of the Musconetcong Mountain drain into the Spruce Run.

History
In 1964, the Spruce Run Reservoir Dam was built by the New Jersey Water Supply Authority, forming the Spruce Run Reservoir. The reservoir is the third largest in the state and is encompassed by the Spruce Run Recreation Area. The source of the stream is protected, located in Crystal Springs Preserve, a county park. In addition, several sections of the stream are protected for fishing, hiking and nature observation.

Gallery

See also
 List of rivers of New Jersey

References

External links
 
 

Tributaries of the Raritan River
Rivers of New Jersey
Rivers of Hunterdon County, New Jersey